Cochabamba is a city and municipality in central Bolivia in a valley in the Andes mountain range. It is the capital of the Cochabamba Department and the fourth largest city in Bolivia, with a population of 630,587 according to the 2012 Bolivian census. Its name is from a compound of the Quechua words qucha "lake" and pampa, "open plain." Residents of the city and the surrounding areas are commonly referred to as cochalas or, more formally, cochabambinos.

It is known as the "City of Eternal Spring" or "The Garden City" because of its spring-like temperatures all year round. It is also known as "La Llajta," which means "town" in Quechua. It is the largest urban center between the higher capital of La Paz and Santa Cruz de la Sierra in the tropical plains of the east. It sits south-west of the Tunari mountains, and north of the foothills of the Valle Alto. In antiquity, the area featured numerous lakes, which gave the city its name. Many of these lakes have since disappeared to urban development, but Coña Coña and Alalay lakes are extant examples. It has been a populated settlement since the Pre-Inca period, and is today an important cultural, educational, political, and commercial centre.

History

Pre-Inca and Inca
The Cochabamba valley has been inhabited for thousands of years due to its fertile productive soils and mild climate. Archaeological evidence suggests that the initial inhabitants were of indigenous ethnic groups: Tiwanaku, Tupuraya, Mojocoya, Omereque, and Inca inhabited the valley at times before the Spanish arrived.

The area got its name from Quechua Kochaj-pampa, as part of the Inca civilization. The area was conquered by Topa Inca Yupanqui (ruled 1471–1493). His son Huayna Capac turned Cochabamba into a large production enclave or state farm to serve the Incas. The local population was possibly depleted during the Inca conquest and Huayna Capac imported 14,000 people, called mitimas, to work the land. The principal crop was maize which could not be grown in much of the high and cold heartland of the Inca Empire. The maize was stored in 2,400 storehouses (qollqas) in the hills overlooking the valley or transported by llama caravan to storage sites in Paria, Cusco, of other Inca administrative centres.  Most of the maize was probably used to sustain the Inca army during its campaigns.

Spanish and Bolivian
The first Spanish inhabitant of the valley was Garci Ruiz de Orellana in 1542. He purchased the majority of the land from local tribal chiefs Achata and Consavana through a title registered in 1552 at the Imperial City of Potosí. The price paid was 130 pesos. His residence, known as the House of Mayorazgo, stands in the Cala Cala neighbourhood.

The city, called Villa de Oropesa, was founded on 2 August 1571 by order of Viceroy Francisco de Toledo, Count of Oropesa. It was to be an agricultural production centre to provide food and wood for the mining towns of the relatively nearby Altiplano region, particularly Potosí which became one of the largest and richest cities in the world during the 16th and 17th centuries — funding the vast wealth that ultimately made Spain a world power. In fact, anthropologist Jack Weatherford and others have cited the city of Potosí as the birth of capitalism because of the money and materialism it provided Spain. Thus, with the silver mining industry in Potosí at its height, Cochabamba thrived during its first centuries. However, the city entered a period of decline during the 18th century as mining began to wane.

In 1786, King Charles III of Spain renamed the city the 'loyal and valiant' Villa of Cochabamba. This was done to commend the city's pivotal role in suppressing the indigenous rebellions of 1781 in Oruro by sending armed forces to Oruro to quell the uprisings. Since the late 19th century it has again been generally successful as an agricultural centre for Bolivia.

The 1793 census shows that the city had a population of 22,305 persons. There were 12,980 mestizos, 6,368 Spaniards, 1,182 indigenous natives, 1,600 mulattos and 175 African slaves.

In 1812, Cochabamba was the site of a riot against the Spanish Army. On May 27, thousands of women took up arms against the Spanish. According to historian Nathaniel Aguirre: "From Cochabamba, many men have fled. Not one woman. On the hillside, a great clamour. Cochabamba's plebeian women, at bay, fight from the centre of a circle of fire. Surrounded by five thousand Spaniards, they resist with battered tin guns and a few arquebuses; and they fight to the last yell, whose echoes will resound throughout the long war for independence. Whenever his army weakens, General Manuel Belgrano will shout those words which never fail to restore courage and spark anger. The general will ask his vacillating soldiers: 'Are the women of Cochabamba present?"

To celebrate their bravery, Bolivia now marks May 27 as Mother's Day.

In 1900, the population was 21,886.

Besides a number of schools and charitable institutions, the Catholic diocese has 55 parishes, 80 churches and chapels, and 160 priests.

Water War

In 1998, the International Monetary Fund (IMF) agreed to give Bolivia a loan of $138 million to control inflation and promote economic growth. However, it only agreed to do so on the condition that Bolivia sell "all remaining public enterprises," including its national oil refineries and the local water company, SEMAPA. In 1999, a group of private investors, specifically the Bechtel Corporation with headquarters in San Francisco, California, United States of America, came together under the name of Aguas del Tunari and bought the rights for the privatization of the city's water. In that same year, the World Bank (WB) refused to subsidize the water to help lower the cost for the people. Then in 2000, the people of Cochabamba began to protest as water priced hiked to a 50% increase that the majority could not afford. The Coalition for the Defense of Water and Life, and its leader Oscar Olivera, started a demonstration in La Plaza 14 de Septiembre also known as La Plaza Principal. The march was meant to be peaceful, but after two days the police used tear gas against the protestors and injured about 175 people and killed 1 and blinded two. Soon after, news reports were made about the protests and the violence. The Defense of Water and Life held an unofficial referendum and 96% of 50,000 people wanted Aguas del Tunari's contract to terminate, but the government refused. The protests only grew and the entire world began to watch forcing Bechtel to leave its contract and return SEMAPA to the public. Bechtel as well tried to sue the Bolivian government for $50 million but it withdrew its claim shortly after. This event was soon labelled as the Water Wars and became a driving force for anti-globalization projects such as the UN's decision to make water sanitation a human right and the privatisation of water as unethical in 2010. Additionally, the Water Wars would help spark the next revolt against the privatisation of natural gases from 2003 to 2005 which would lead to the removal of two presidents, Gonzalo Sánchez de Lozada and Carlos Mesa, and the rise of President Evo Morales in 2006.

In January 2007, city dwellers clashed with mostly rural protestors, leaving four dead and over 130 injured. The first democratically elected Prefect of Cochabamba, Manfred Reyes Villa, had allied himself with the leaders of Bolivia's Eastern Departments in a dispute with President Evo Morales over regional autonomy and other political issues. The protestors blockaded the highways, bridges, and main roads, having days earlier set fire to the departmental seat of government, trying to force the resignation of Reyes Villa. Citizens attacked the protestors, breaking the blockade and routing them, while the police did little to stop the violence. Further attempts by the protestors to reinstate the blockade and threaten the government were unsuccessful, but the underlying tensions had not been resolved.

In July 2007, a monument erected by veterans of January's protest movement in honour of those killed and injured by government supporters was destroyed in the middle of the night, reigniting racial conflicts in the city.

In August 2008, a nationwide referendum was held. The prefect of Cochabamba, Manfred Reyes Villa, was not confirmed by the voters of the department. The mayor of Cochabamba in 2018 is José María Leyes.

Climate
Cochabamba is known for its "Eternal Spring". Neither experiencing the humid heat of Santa Cruz nor the frigid winds of La Paz, Cochabamba experiences a semi-arid climate (Köppen: BSk), bordering on a subtropical highland climate (Köppen: Cwb). The characteristic of the climate is an extended dry season that runs from May until October with a wet season that generally begins in November with the principal rains ending in March.

People and culture

Cochabamba is known as the heart of Bolivia and the gastronomic capital. Traditional cuisine includes: salteñas, chuño, tucumanas, pique macho, silpancho, anticucho, sopa de mani, chicharrón, charke, fricasé, rellenos de papa and many more dishes.

The international street art festival known as the BAU (Bienal de Arte Urbano) has been hosted in Cochabamba every two years since 2011. The festival is organized by proyecto mARTadero, a local cultural centre. In 2011, 2013, 2015, and 2017 the painting was done in the Villa Coronilla, and Geronimo de Osorio neighbourhoods. In 2019 the festival focused on the neighbourhood Esperanza, on the edge of the Alalay Lake. The festival has featured internationally renowned artists such as Blu (Italy) and Inti (Chile).

Commensurate with other large cities in the Andean highlands of South America, Cochabamba is a city of contrasts. Its central commercial districts, Zona Norte, is bounded by Plaza Colón and Plaza 14 de Septiembre, are generally equipped with modern urban amenities and are where the majority of the city's formal business and commercial industries are based. La Cancha, the largest open-air market in South America, is also an active place where locals can buy a range of items. An active nightlife is centered around Calle España and along the broad, tree-lined boulevard, El Prado. In contrast, the Zona Sur, a remote area adjacent to the Wilstermann International Airport is visibly impoverished, with adobe homes and unpaved roads, which is often the first impression visitors acquire while commuting into the city.

In 2009, the government under President Evo Morales created a new constitution that declared Spanish and 36 other indigenous languages as the official languages of the country. However, the most widely spoken languages in Cochabamba are Spanish and Quechua. Although the Spanish that is spoken in the Cochabamba region is generally regarded as rather conservative in its phonetics and vocabulary, the use of Quechua terminology (wawa [child] and wistupiku [mouth or twist lips]) has been widely incorporated into its standardized form.

As with most cities around the globe, English is increasingly spoken and understood, particularly among business-minded indigenous and repatriated Cochabambinos. English-language instruction has become incorporated into some private schools and universities but is not taught universally, therefore a vast majority of the population does not speak English.

About four-fifths of the population of Bolivia identifies as Catholic.

Like other cities that share the same ethnic group quadrants like Salta or Cuenca, Cochabamba's demographics consist of the following visible groups in order of prevalence: Indigenous (mostly of Quechua and Aymara ethnicity) people, Mestizo, or mixed Indigenous and Spanish European, and people of Spanish (Criollos) and other European descent. As well as a fairly significant population of Afro-Bolivians.

By 2013, the human development index of the Metropolitan region of Cochabamba was 0.801 as a result of a 35% growth in the last 20 years.

Government
Cochabamba, formally the municipality of Cercado, is the capital of Cochabamba department. The city government is divided into executive and legislative branches. The mayor of Cochabamba is the head of the city government, elected by general election for a term of five years. The mayor heads an executive branch, which includes six sub-mayors and a variety of departments comprising 950 functionaries. The 11-member municipal council is the legislative branch.

The current mayor is José María Leyes of the Social Democrat Movement (MDS for its initials in Spanish).

Economy

The area where Cochabamba is situated is commonly referred to as the granary of Bolivia. Its climate is milder than that of the Altiplano region to the west and thus permits extensive agriculture, including grains, potatoes, and coffee in the highlands and sugar cane, cocoa beans, tobacco, and fruit in the Chapare tropical lowlands of the South American Amazon region, an area that had been one of the country's main coca-leaf-producing regions.

Cochabamba is also the industrial hub of Bolivia, producing cars, cleaning products, cosmetics, chemicals, and other items like cement. The economy of Cochabamba is characterized by producing goods and services. Recently, the software industry is becoming increasingly important. International companies like GOJA and Assuresoft also have subsidiaries in Cochabamba. Due to this industry growth, Cochabamba is called the "Silicon Valley of Bolivia", with a high demand for professionals immersed in technological careers such as Systems Engineering, Telecommunications and Information Technology.

The airline Boliviana de Aviación has its headquarters in Cochabamba. The defunct airline Lloyd Aéreo Boliviano (LAB Airlines) had its management offices on the grounds of Jorge Wilstermann Airport in Cochabamba. In Cochabamba construction has been rapidly increasing in the last couple of years with more than 750 construction sites per year.

Narcotrafic is now controlled in Cochabamba, which used to be related to cocaine dealers several years ago.

Urban transport
The metropolitan area of Cochabamba (Vinto, Tiquipaya, Quillacollo, Colcapirhua, Cochabamba and Sacaba) has an extensive transportation system, which cover all the districts.

There are almost 70 bus and minibus lines, from A to Z, and dozens of minibuses and fixed-route trufis (T.RU.FI, or "taxi con ruta fija") taxi lines. Most lines have GPS system for monitoring and regulation of hour (line 1, line 16, line L, Line 3V, line 20, line 30, etc.). The T.RU.FI service has at least 60 lines; they are identified by signs on the roof of the vehicle showing the route from the initial stop until the final stop, which is also indicated by the line number to which it belongs. The busiest bus lines are:

Line "Q" (CBBA-QLLO)
Line "W" (CBBA-QLLO)
Line "3V"
Line "B" (Airport)
Line "K"
Line "X-10"
Line "36"
Line "1"
Line "30"
Line "13"
Line "Z-12" (CBBA-TIQUIPAYA)

And the busiest trufi taxi lines are:

Taxi Trufi "110"
Taxi Trufi "260" (Cochabamba-Quillacollo Line)
Taxi Trufi "270" (Cochabamba-Quillacollo Line)
Taxi Trufi "103" (Green line and White Line)
Taxi Trufi "106" (Tiquipaya Line)
Taxi Trufi "130" (Circular)
Taxi Trufi "209" (Circular) (Cochabamba-Quillacollo Line)
Taxi Trufi "123"
Taxi Trufi "224" (Sacaba Line)
Taxi Trufi "240" (Sacaba Line)
Taxi Trufi "244" (Sacaba Line)
Taxi Trufi "115"

Light Rail

Construction on an interurban light rail network known as Mi Tren linking Cochabamba with Suticollo, El Castillo and San Simon University began in 2017. Opening of the Red Line and first phase of the Green Line took place September 13, 2022.

Basic services
EMSA, the municipal sanitation company, is responsible for the pickup, transportation, storage and removed from urban waste produced. EMSA covers 88% of the city and collects 400 tonnes of waste produced per day. Through the municipal government of Cochabamba, special containers made available throughout the city for the storage of solid waste common. The municipality's sole disposal facility, the K'ara K'ara waste dump (Botadero K'ara K'ara), has been the centre of a long-running controversy over pollution of the air and groundwater; it is frequently blockaded by neighbouring residents demanding changes.

Media

Print media
There are several newspapers in Cochabamba:
 Los Tiempos
 Opinión
 La Voz
 Gente

Radio stations
The main radio stations scattered across the department and the capital are:
 Estrella FM 93,1
 Centro Ltda.
 Mega DJ
 Milenio
 La Voz del Juno
 Kancha Parlaspa
 Bandera Tricolor
 Cochabamba
 Gaviota Dorada
 Del Valle
 San Rafael
 La Voz del Valle - Punata
 Continental
 Oro
 Triunfo Morena
 Epoca
 La Verdad F.M.100.7
 M&D Comunicaciones
 Universal
 Fantástico 97.1
 Panorama FM 90.9
 Punata radio Panorama FM 88.9
 FM-100 Clásica
 FM Stereo 98.7 – La voz de América
 Bethel FFM 95.5
 Ritmo 97.5
 La Triple Nueve 99.9
 La Fabrica de la Musica 107.1
 Magnal de Capinota
 Radios Fides Cochabamba, Punata y Chapare
 CEPRA Pongo Khasa 1,390 AM
 Sonido Lider 95.9 FM
 Pio XII FM 97.9
 Mundial
 Porvenir
 Radio Cosmos de Bolivia
 CEPRA - Centro de Producción Radiofónica
 CEPRA - Radio Morochota
 Enlace
 Radio HIT 105.7
 Radio Disney Bolivia

Television channels
In the capital and throughout the department there are many television channels that broadcast on local, provincial, national or international all day or part of it. The transmission towers that transmit channels nationally and internationally are in the high Cala Cala, Villa Moscu or Villa Taquiña.

 Canal 2: Canal 2 Cochabamba Corazón de América (local)
 Canal 4: Red ATB (national)
 Canal 5: Red Bolivisión (national)
 Canal 7: Bolivia TV (Channel of the State)
 Canal 9: Red Uno de Bolivia (national)
 Canal 11::TVU (local)
 Canal 13: Red Unitel (national)
 Canal 15:  Cristo Viene la Red (Religious Channel)
 Canal 17: sko TV (local)
 Canal 18: Radio Televisión Popular (RTP) (national)
 Canal 20: Piñami de Comunicaciones (provincial)
 Canal 21:  Tele C (local)
 Canal 24: Red ADVenir Internacional (Christian Channel/International)
 Canal 26: Metro TV (local)
Canal 27: Sistema Cristiano de Comunicaciones (local)
 Canal 30: 30 TV (local)
 Canal 36: Cadena A (national)
 Canal 39: Univalle TV (local)
 Canal 42: Red PAT (national)
 Canal 45: Abya Yala Television (national)
 Canal 48: Red Unitepc (local)
 Canal 51: MTV Cochabamba(local)
 Canal 57: RTL Canal de Noticias(local)

Education

The city is the home of the University of San Simón (UMSS, for "Universidad Mayor de San Simón"), one of the largest and most prominent public universities in Bolivia. UMSS is the second best university in Bolivia according to QS World University Rankings in 2013 but measured by the web metric scores as the first one during 2013–2017. Among the private universities in Bolivia ranking in the top ten are the Universidad Privada Boliviana (a prestigious business university), Universidad del Valle (a strong university in medicine with a large enrollment of international students) and  Universidad Católica Boliviana "San Pablo". Other well-ranked universities include Escuela Militar de Ingenieria "Antonio Jose de Sucre", Universidad Simón I. Patiño, Universidad de Aquino Bolivia, Universidad Adventista de Bolivia, Universidad Privada Domingo Savio and Universidad Privada Abierta Latinoamericana (UPAL). Cochabamba became the second recipient city of Brazilian students in Bolivia after the city of Santa Cruz, due to the affordable and good living conditions of the city. Also, Cochabamba is the home of one of the best schools of Bolivia, Colegio San Agustín.

Airport
Cochabamba is served by the modern Jorge Wilstermann International Airport (IATA code CBB), which handles domestic and international flights. It houses the headquarters of Boliviana de Aviación (BOA) Bolivia's national airline and, in the past, of Lloyd Aéreo Boliviano, Bolivia's former national airline. Other domestic airlines that serve the airport include Línea Aérea Amaszonas, Ecojet and Transporte Aéreo Militar.

Neighborhoods
Cochabamba is a steadily emerging market within the Bolivian real estate industry. Since 2010, it became the city with the most surface area in construction in Bolivia overpassing Santa Cruz and La Paz.  There are many middle and large buildings under construction by 2012. An annual mild climate, abundant greenery, mountain vistas, and a progressive local economy are factors that have contributed to the city's appeal to Bolivian nationals, expatriates and foreigners alike. Historic and affluent neighbourhoods such as Cala Cala, El Mirador, and Lomas de Aranjuez showcase some of the city's most distinguished residences.

Queru Queru - North
La Recoleta - North
Cala Cala - North
Lomas de Aranjuez - North
El Mirador - North
Las Brisas - North
Sarco - Northwest
Mayorazgo - Northwest
Barrio Profesional - Northwest
America Oeste - Northwest
Colquiri - Northwest
Muyurina - Northeast
Tupuraya - Northeast

Hippodromo - West
Villa Busch - West
Temporal - North
La Chimba - Southwest
Aeropuerto - Southwest
Ticti Norte - Fringe North
Jaihuayco - South
Zona sud - South
Ticti - South
Valle Hermoso - South

Metropolitan area
Cochabamba is connected with the following towns and cities:
Quillacollo
Sacaba
Vinto
Colcapirhua
Tiquipaya
Cliza
Tarata
Ironcollo
Punata

Additional notes of interest
 Cochabamba is also mentioned in the documentary The Corporation, about their fight against the privatisation of water by a foreign-owned company, against which the people protested and won. The privatisation had gone to such an extent that even rainwater was not allowed to be collected. Read Cochabamba protests of 2000.
 Cochabamba has been confirmed to be the seat of a future South American Parliament when it is formed by UNASUR. UNASUR has yet to determine what the composition of the Parliament will be, but existing treaties all agree it will meet in Cochabamba.
 Cochabamba was the first place rugby union in Bolivia was formally established.
 Cochabamba was featured as a location in the story in the 1983 film, Scarface. Powerful drug lord Alejandro Sosa resided there, governed large coca plantations and owned cocaine labs whereupon further refining, would be shipped to Tony Montana in Florida.
 Cochabamba is the setting of the 2010 movie También la lluvia (Even the rain), which takes place during the water war of 2000. It depicts a crew making a movie about the colonization of Latin America when the protests against privatization erupt. The film stars Mexican actor Gael García Bernal, and received positive reviews.
 Cochabamba is also the site of several major spammers, as confirmed by the watchdog group Spamhaus.

Notable residents

Business people
 Simón Iturri Patiño (1862–1947), mining magnate

Educators and intellectuals
Jaime Escalante, professor and teacher whose life was dramatized in the 1988 film Stand and Deliver
 Renato Prada Oropeza, professor, semiologist, writer
Thäddeus Haenke (1761-1816), botanist

Musicians
 Katia Escalera, Soprano
 Jaime Laredo, (b. 1941), classical violinist
 Los Kjarkas, Cochabambino folk music group

Literature
 Nataniel Aguirre (1843–1888), author
 Adela Zamudio (1874–1925), author and poet
 Jesús Lara (1898–1975), author and poet
 Gaby Vallejo Canedo (1941), author, professor of Literature
 Edmundo Paz Soldán,  author
 Marcelo Quiroga Santa Cruz (1931–1980), author and politician
 Javier del Granado (1913–1996), poet laureate
 Julia Urquidi (1926-2010), writer, remembered as Mario Vargas Llosa's first wife
 Renato Prada Oropeza (1937–2011), novelist and poet
 Sara Ugarte de Salamanca, poet who had the memorial built to the heroines on 1812
 Óscar Únzaga de la Vega (1916–1959), journalist and historian

Other
Oscar Olivera (1955), environmental activist

Nazis
Klaus Barbie (1913–1991), German SS and Gestapo functionary

Twin towns – sister cities

Cochabamba is twinned with:

 Bergamo Italy, since 2008
 Córdoba, Argentina, since 1989
 Kunming, China, since 1990
 Montevideo, Uruguay since 2005
 Viedma, Argentina, since 2009
 Caracas, Venezuela, since 2009

See also
 World People's Conference on Climate Change
 2000 Cochabamba protests
 Freternindad Folklórica y Cultural Caporales Universitarios de San Simon
 2018 South American Games

Notes

References

External links

 Weather in Cochabamba
 The History of Cochabamba 
 Cbba.info  Map of Cochabamba City

 
Populated places established in 1571
Populated places in Cochabamba Department
1571 establishments in the Spanish Empire
1571 establishments in South America